Daffymitra is a genus of sea snails, marine gastropod mollusks in the family Volutomitridae.

Species
Species within the genus Daffymitra include:

 Daffymitra lindae Harasewych & Kantor, 2005

References

Volutomitridae
Monotypic gastropod genera